Ordinary Grace is a book written by William Kent Krueger and published by Atria Books (now owned by Simon & Schuster) on 26 March 2013 which later went on to win the Edgar Award for Best Novel in 2014.

References 

Edgar Award-winning works
American young adult novels
American historical novels
Novels set in Minnesota
2013 American novels
Atria Publishing Group books